A substitute check or cheque, also called an image cash letter (ICL), clearing replacement document (CRD), or image replacement document (IRD), is a negotiable instrument used in electronic banking systems to represent a physical paper  cheque (check).  It may be wholly digital from payment initiation to clearing and settlement or it may be a digital reproduction (truncation) of an original paper check.

Standards and formats
Software providers have developed "Virtual Check 21" standards within electronic banking systems which allows creation and submission of demand draft documents to the bank of deposit.

Standards may include: 
 Remotely created checks (RCC)
 X9.37 files

Geographical significance

United States

The beginnings of substitute checks in the United States were formalized by the Check 21 Act which came into effect in 2004.

See also
 Remote deposit
 Cheque truncation

References

External links
Understanding Laurentian Bank Cheque

Banking in the United States
Federal Reserve System
Negotiable instrument law
Cheques
Banking technology
Banking terms